The 2016–17 Saudi Professional League (also known as the Jameel League for sponsorship reasons) was the 41st season of Saudi Professional League, the top Saudi professional league for association football clubs, since its inception in 1976. The season started on 11 August 2016 and concluded on 4 May 2017.

Al-Hilal won their fourteenth league title, and first since the 2010–11 season, with two matches to spare following a 2–1 win over Al-Shabab on 20 April. The defending champions were Al-Ahli who finished as runners-up.

Al-Ettifaq and Al-Batin entered as the two promoted teams from the 2015–16 Saudi First Division.

Teams
The league comprises 14 teams, 11 from the 2015–16 campaign, as well as two teams promoted from the 2015–16 First Division and the relegation play-off winners.

On the final day of the season Al-Mojzel won the First Division title and their first-ever promotion to the top flight after a 3–2 win against Al-Jeel. Al-Ettifaq were also promoted after they finished in 2nd place, it will be their first participation in the Pro League since the 2013–14 season. The two promoted teams replaced Najran and Hajer. Al-Raed were relegation play-off winners.

On 3 August 2016, Al-Mojzel were stripped of their tile and were instead relegated to the Second Division due to a match fixing scandal. The SAFF decided to promote Al-Batin instead.

Stadiums and locations

Notes

Personnel and kits

Managerial changes

Foreign players
The number of foreign players is limited to 4 per team, and should not be a goalkeeper.

League table

Positions by round
The following table lists the positions of teams after each week of matches. In order to preserve the chronological evolution, any postponed matches are not included to the round at which they were originally scheduled, but added to the full round they were played immediately afterwards. If a club from the Saudi Professional League wins the King Cup, they will qualify for the AFC Champions League, unless they have already qualified for it through their league position. In this case, an additional AFC Champions League group stage berth will be given to the 3rd placed team, and the AFC Champions League play-off round spot will be given to 4th.

Results

Season progress

Relegation play-offs
Al-Batin which finished 12th will face Najran, the 3rd-placed 2016–17 Saudi First Division side for a two-legged play-off. Al-Batin beat Najran 3–2 on aggregate.

First leg

Second leg

Statistics

Top scorers

Top assists

Hat-tricks

4 Player scored four goals

Clean sheets

Discipline

Player 

 Most yellow cards: 11
 Yassin Barnawi (Al-Qadsiah)

 Most red cards: 2
 Hatim Belal (Al-Wehda)
 Adama François Sene (Al-Khaleej)

Club 

 Most yellow cards: 59
 Al-Raed

 Most red cards: 5
 Al-Khaleej
 Al-Wehda

Attendances

By round

Source:

By team

†

†

See also
 2016–17 Saudi First Division
 2017 King Cup
 2016–17 Crown Prince Cup
 2016 Super Cup

References

Saudi Professional League seasons
Saudi Professional League
1